Easterwood Airport (Easterwood Field) is a regional airport in College Station, Texas, with Texas A&M University, Bryan-College Station, and Brazos County, Texas as its communities. There is no public transportation from Easterwood Airport to the surrounding cities; however, in the fall of 2019, a new university bus route was established to connect Easterwood Airport with the Engineering Quad and the Texas A&M Hotel and Conference Center. The airport bus route is available only to those with a University ID or Brazos Transit District ID. Despite owning and managing the airport, there are no aviation courses at the university.

The William A. McKenzie Terminal at Easterwood Airport provides daily flights to Dallas/Fort Worth, Houston and seasonal service to Birmingham (AL). The terminal has free 2 hour visitor parking and drop off areas on the upper level and shuttle/taxi pick up areas on the lower level.

The ticket counters, TSA security checkpoint, and boarding areas are on the upper level of the terminal. Baggage claim and rental car agencies are on the lower level.

History

In 1938 the Board of Directors of the Agricultural and Mechanical College of Texas (as Texas A&M was known at the time) authorized the development of an airport at the existing site. The University applied to the Civil Aeronautics Authority (CAA) for certification as a primary flight training school under provisions of the Civilian Pilot Training Program.

In May 1940 the airport opened, named for U.S. Navy Lieutenant Jesse L. Easterwood. Easterwood was a former A&M student who enlisted in the British Royal Naval Air Service in 1917. After being commissioned as Ensign, he was later promoted to Lieutenant in the Naval Air Service and was the second American to qualify as Naval Aviation Pilot. He served with the Royal Flying Corps in 1918 and had sixteen successful raids behind German lines. He served in three foreign countries and was killed in an airplane accident in the Canal Zone May 19, 1919. He was awarded the Navy Cross posthumously "for distinguished and heroic service as an aviator."

The facility in 1940 had one hangar and a turf landing strip and taxiway which were eventually paved through funding provided by the CAA, the Works Projects Administration (WPA), and Texas A&M.

In 1948 a large hangar was relocated to the airfield from a US Army flying field near Corsicana, Texas. The FAA established a Flight Service Station (FSS) at the Airport in 1951 and Pioneer Airlines began scheduled air service in that year. Many changes have occurred including moving the Flight Service Station to Montgomery County - as of 2022, only American Eagle provides scheduled air service. United Express formerly served the airport from Houston, but ended this service on Jan. 4, 2022. 

The first control tower was erected at the Airport in 1952 and a commercial passenger terminal was constructed in 1957. Work began on an extension of Runway 16-34 (now 17–35) to its present  length in 1984. At the same time the parallel taxiway to Runway 16-34 was extended.

In 1988 work began on improvements to the Airport access road and construction of a new passenger terminal began. The new McKenzie Terminal opened in 1990 and plans were made to convert the old passenger terminal into a general aviation terminal. It was remodeled and re-opened for service in 1994 as a modern general aviation facility, housing line service and support personnel as well as flight operations.

Facilities

In the year ending December 31, 2019, the airport had 56,749 aircraft operations, average 155 per day: 58% general aviation, 33% military, 9% air taxi and <1% airline. 50 aircraft were then based at this airport: 25 single-engine, 5 multi-engine, 18 jet and 2 helicopter.

Transportation
No public transportation infrastructure is available at Easterwood.  Thus, travellers must utilize private transportation options including taxis, rental car services, and ride sharing.  Texas A&M University has a shuttle bus designated as "Route 7" that runs between the University campus and Easterwood Airport, and is only available to students, faculty, and Texas A&M hotel guests. There are a few taxi companies registered with the City of College Station and the Easterwood Airport management. Rental car offices are located inside the terminal, while designated spaces for taxis and ride-shares are found outside.

Airline and destination

American Eagle flights to Dallas–Fort Worth are operated by Envoy Air using Bombardier CRJ700s and Embraer ERJ145s.

Statistics

See also

 Texas World War II Army Airfields

References
 Thole, Lou (1999), Forgotten Fields of America : World War II Bases and Training, Then and Now - Vol. 2. Publisher: Pictorial Histories Pub,

External links
 Easterwood Airport, official website
 
 
 

Airports in Texas
Transportation in Brazos County, Texas
Buildings and structures in Brazos County, Texas
College Station, Texas
Bryan, Texas
Texas A&M University
University and college airports
Airfields of the United States Army Air Forces in Texas
1940 establishments in Texas
Airports established in 1940
Universities and colleges in the United States